The Steel Bonnets (London: Barrie & Jenkins) is a 1971 historical non-fiction book by George MacDonald Fraser about the Border Reivers.

Fraser researched the book with his wife.  It concentrates mainly on the 16th century, and seeks to de-glamourise the period in some ways.

References

1971 non-fiction books
20th-century history books
Border Reivers
Works by George MacDonald Fraser